Anna Hairapetian (born September 8 1989) is an Armenian chess player holding the title of Woman International Master (WIM) and a former Armenian women's champion.

Career
Hairapetian won the Armenian Women's Chess Championship in 2013. She competed at the 40th Chess Olympiad for Armenia. She also competed at the 2013 European Team Chess Championship, in which the Armenian women's team finished 5th.

References

External links
 
 
 Anna Hairapetian chess games at 365Chess.com

1989 births
Living people
Chess Woman International Masters
Armenian female chess players